The Chaplain of the United States Coast Guard (COCG) is the senior chaplain of the United States Coast Guard (USCG) and is attached to USCG headquarters in Washington, D.C. as a United States Navy Chaplain Corps officer who reports directly to the Commandant of the Coast Guard. The current Chaplain of the Coast Guard is Captain Daniel L. Mode, USN.

Purpose
The Chaplain of the Coast Guard serves as the Commandant's senior advisor on matters pertaining to chaplains and the free exercise of religion as enshrined in First Amendment to the United States Constitution as exercised by USCG personnel and their eligible family members.  Chaplains provide religious ministry, advocate for and promote the well-being of USCG personnel, and serve as command liaison officers to civilian religious leaders, communities, organizations and agencies.  The duties of the office are described in the Commandant's Religious Ministries in the Coast Guard instruction.

The USCG does not have an organic chaplain corps; chaplains from the United States Navy Chaplain Corps are assigned to the USCG to serve in USCG billets.  Traditionally, documents such as the USCG Chaplains Orientation Manual provided guidance for Navy chaplains assigned to USCG duties.  Chaplains are clergy who hail from many different faiths and denominations and may be ordained or appointed as ministers, priests, imams, and rabbis by their denomination.

U.S. Coast Guard Chaplains

See also
United States military chaplains
Chiefs of Chaplains of the United States
Chaplain's Medal for Heroism
Armed Forces Chaplains Board
Chief of Chaplains of the United States Navy
United States Navy Chaplain Corps
Badges of the United States Coast Guard
United States Coast Guard

References

United States Coast Guard job titles

United States Coast